Bergsøy or Bergsøya may refer to:

Places
Bergsøya, Akershus, an island in Enebakk municipality in Akershus county, Norway
Bergsøya, Gjemnes, an island in Gjemnes municipality in Møre og Romsdal county, Norway
Bergsøya, Herøy, an island in Herøy municipality in Møre og Romsdal county, Norway
Bergsøya, Nordland, an island in Vestvågøy municipality in Nordland county, Norway

Sports
Bergsøy IL, an association football club in Herøy municipality in Møre og Romsdal county, Norway